The Indianapolis mayoral election of 2003 took place on November 4, 2003. Voters elected the Mayor of Indianapolis, members of the Indianapolis City-County Council, as well as several other local officials. Incumbent Democrat Bart Peterson was reelected to a second term.

Primaries
Primaries were held on May 6.

Democratic primary

Republican primary

Polling

Election results
Peterson won reelection by a large margin.

2003 was a good year for Democrats in Indiana's mayoral elections, with the party winning control of the mayoralties of all of the state's top seven most populous cities for the first time since 1959. The Democratic Party also won control of the mayoralties in twenty of the state's thirty cities with populations above 25,000. Additionally, in 2003, Democrats won more than 56% of partisan mayoral races in Indiana.

During the general election, Marion County, saw voter turnout of 27% in its various elections.

Notes

References

2003
2003 United States mayoral elections
2003 Indiana elections